Orrin Johnson (1865 – 1943) was an American stage actor. He also appeared in seven films during the silent era.

Johnson was born on December 1, 1865, in Louisville, Kentucky. His professional theatrical debut came in Hazel Kirk. His performances on Broadway began with his portrayal of Edward Seabury in Men and Women (1890) and ended when he played George Lorrimer in Ostriches (1925).

Johnson married Isabel B. Smith, a widow, on June 16, 1918, in Neenah, Wisconsin. He died on November 24, 1943, at his home in Neenah, aged 77.

Selected filmography
 The Penitentes (1915)
 The Light at Dusk (1916)
 The Three Musketeers (1916)

References

Bibliography
 Davis, Ronald L. William S. Hart: Projecting the American West. University of Oklahoma Press, 2003.

External links

1865 births
1943 deaths
American male film actors
American male stage actors
Male actors from Louisville, Kentucky
Broadway theatre people